Girl's Night Out is a 2015 Spanish comedy film directed by  which stars Natalia de Molina, Úrsula Corberó, María Hervás, Celia de Molina and Brays Efe.

Plot 
Gisela, Nora, Marta, Tania and Mateo are five 27-year-old friends who, as teenagers, aspired to finding a well-paid job, a sexy boyfriend and living in a big apartment in the centre of Madrid. What they got is a shared flat, jobs as interns that only allow them to buy new clothes at the sales and dating guys who are allergic to commitment. When Gisela announces her wedding, they decide to set up the craziest and hardest bachelorette party of their lives in Gran Canaria. But what is supposed to be a weekend of fun ends up getting out of control.

Cast

Release 
Distributed by DeAPlaneta, it was theatrically released in Spain on 24 April 2015.

Reception 
Pere Vall of Fotogramas rated Girl's Night Out 3 out of 5 stars, considering that the film starts off like a rocket and then has a hard time keeping up.

See also 
 List of Spanish films of 2015

References

External links 
Official website

2015 films
Spanish comedy films
2015 comedy films
Nostromo Pictures films
Atresmedia Cine films
2010s Spanish films
2010s Spanish-language films